Qixing District is a district of the city of Guilin, Guangxi, China.

Qixing District is divided into Qixingqu Subdistrict, Dongjiang Subdistrict, Chuanshan Subdistrict, Lidong Subdistrict, Chaoyang Township, and Guilin Overseas Chinese Tourism Economic Zone Management Committee.

References

County-level divisions of Guangxi
Administrative divisions of Guilin